Turbo cailletii, common name the filose turban, is a species of sea snail, a marine gastropod mollusk in the family Turbinidae, the turban snails.

Distribution
This species occurs in the Gulf of Mexico, the Caribbean Sea and the Lesser Antilles.

Description 
The maximum recorded shell length is 37 mm.

The ovate-conic shell is perforate, solid, and shining. The sutures are impressed. The 5-6 whorls are convex, rounded, and spirally lirate. The body whorl exceeds the balance of the shell in length. It contains six prominent spiral lirae and is minutely lirate around the umbilicus. The ovate aperture is transversely dilated, and silvery within. The peristome is acute. The white columella is thickened. The color pattern of the shell is intense orange-red, the lirae are punctate with white. The white operculum is convex on its outside.

Habitat 
Minimum recorded depth is 4 m. Maximum recorded depth is 36 m.

References
Notes

Bibliography
 Wood, W. 1828. Supplement to the Index Testaceologicus.  viii + 59 pp., 8 pls. W. Wood: London. 
 Fischer, [P.] and Bernardi, [A. C.] 1857. Descriptions d'espèces nouvelles. Journal de Conchyliologie 5: 292–300, pls. 8-9
 Turgeon, D.D., et al. 1998. Common and scientific names of aquatic invertebrates of the United States and Canada. American Fisheries Society Special Publication 26 page(s): 60
 Alf A. & Kreipl K. (2003). A Conchological Iconography: The Family Turbinidae, Subfamily Turbininae, Genus Turbo. Conchbooks, Hackenheim Germany. 
 Rosenberg, G., F. Moretzsohn, and E. F. García. 2009. Gastropoda (Mollusca) of the Gulf of Mexico, Pp. 579–699 in Felder, D.L. and D.K. Camp (eds.), Gulf of Mexico–Origins, Waters, and Biota. Biodiversity. Texas A&M Press, College Station, Texas.

External links
 

cailletii
Gastropods described in 1857